Asterios 'Stergios' Ikonomikos (born 25 February 2000) is a Greek professional footballer who plays as a midfielder for Serbian club Zlatibor Čajetina.

References

2000 births
Living people
Greek footballers
Greek expatriate footballers
Bohemian Football League players
Football League (Greece) players
Olympia Radotín players
PAS Lamia 1964 players
Niki Volos F.C. players
Association football midfielders